Welty McCullogh (October 10, 1847 – August 31, 1889) was a Republican member of the U.S. House of Representatives from Pennsylvania.

Biography
Welty McCullogh was born in Greensburg, Pennsylvania.  He attended the common schools and Washington and Jefferson College in Washington, Pennsylvania.  He served as second clerk under Captain W. B. Coulter, provost marshal of twenty-first district of Pennsylvania, during the American Civil War.  He graduated from Princeton College in June 1870.  He studied law, was admitted to the bar in 1872 and commenced practice in Greensburg.  He served as assistant solicitor for the Baltimore & Ohio Railroad.

McCullogh was elected as a Republican to the Fiftieth Congress.  He was an unsuccessful candidate for renomination in 1888.  He continued the practice of law until his death in Greensburg in 1889.  Interment in the new St. Clair Cemetery.

References
 Retrieved on 2009-04-26
The Political Graveyard

1847 births
1889 deaths
People of the American Civil War
Pennsylvania lawyers
Washington & Jefferson College alumni
Princeton University alumni
Baltimore and Ohio Railroad people
Republican Party members of the United States House of Representatives from Pennsylvania
19th-century American politicians
19th-century American lawyers